Subcostal may refer to: 
 Subcostal nerve
 Subcostal arteries
 Subcostalis muscle